Bike Index is a nonprofit online bike registry where anyone can register their bicycle for free. Bike Index is based in Chicago, Illinois. Unlike most other registers, the Bike Index database is openly available with an accessible API so that anyone can use it to find and return stolen bicycles. The registry being open to anyone can help track and recover bicycles in different cities or even countries, which would otherwise be difficult with multiple registries with closed access.

Users can register bikes themselves and specify frame serial numbers, list components, and any special characteristics and upload pictures. Bike Index affiliated organizations (i.e., some bike shops) can help the customer perform initial registration upon sale for free, and the customer can later update their registry as usual. In case of theft, the user can mark the bicycle as stolen at bikeindex.org, and having the complete bicycle information ready can also make it easier to file a police report. A user can also transfer the entry to another user if the bicycle changes ownership.

Bike Index also lets their users privately register serial numbers of the keys to their bike locks. Having the key registered can make it easier to contact the manufacturer for a replacement key in case the original key is lost.

History 
The predecessor of Bike Index was the Stolen Bike Registry, founded in 2004 by Bryan Hance. Bike Index was founded in 2013 with a Kickstarter campaign, and Stolen Bike Registry was merged into it in 2014.

In 2016, Bike Index announced integration with LeadsOnline, one of the USA's largest pawn search systems used by law enforcement officers to uncover stolen goods. According to Bryan Hance of Bike Index, "one of the first 'hits' was a bike that was stolen in Salt Lake City, Utah and pawned at a shop in Nevada — 400 miles away."

In 2017, data analysis by a student at the NYC Data Science Academy of the openly available Bike Index data showed that approximately a third of the cataloged bicycles were marked as stolen.

As of 2018, Bike Index has both national partner organizations in the US and international partner organizations across the six countries of Canada, China, India, Mozambique, New Zealand, and the United Kingdom. Bike Index claims to be the largest bike registry in the US, and the most widely used Bike Registry in the world.

How it works 
Both stolen and non-stolen bikes can be registered and listed for free. The user can choose whether their bike information should be private or public and searchable.

By default, all serial numbers and other bike information is listed publicly to allow faster recovery by allowing everyone to look up the bicycle at Bike Index. This can be important in the early phase when a bicycle has been stolen but not reported stolen yet. If the bike has been marked as stolen at Bike Index, other Bike Index users can write the owner a message through their bike page.

Bike Index claims that restricting access to serial numbers only helps thieves but nonetheless gives their users the option.

User privacy 
By default, no personal information about the users or email addresses is listed at Bike Index. If they like, users can create an additional personal page that includes any extra contact information they want to share, but this is not required. Users can, for any reason, choose to make their bike and serial number private and non-searchable at Bike Index. Users can even choose to sign up anonymously.

See also 
 National Bike Registry (Project 529), another large Bike registry based in Seattle, Washington.
 List of bicycle registers

References

External links 
 Bike Index introduction - YouTube
 Comparison of Bike Index and Project 529 online registration systems by Bicycle Security Advisors - bicyclesecurityadvocates.org

Cycling organizations in the United States
Organizations based in Chicago
Bicycle registry
2013 establishments in Illinois